Pål Henning Hansen (born 16 May 1953) is a Norwegian former cyclist. He competed in the individual road race event at the 1976 Summer Olympics.

References

External links
 

1953 births
Living people
Norwegian male cyclists
Olympic cyclists of Norway
Cyclists at the 1976 Summer Olympics
People from Kongsberg
Sportspeople from Viken (county)